Kimmei Seamount is a seamount of the Hawaiian-Emperor seamount chain in the northern Pacific Ocean. It last erupted about 40 million years ago.

See also
List of volcanoes in the Hawaiian – Emperor seamount chain

References

Hawaiian–Emperor seamount chain
Seamounts of the Pacific Ocean
Guyots
Hotspot volcanoes
Eocene volcanoes
Paleogene Oceania